Metalcore is a broad fusion genre of extreme metal and hardcore punk. Its subgenres include mathcore and melodic metalcore. This incomplete list includes bands described as performing any of these styles, including those who also perform other styles (with the exception of deathcore bands, which fuse metalcore with death metal and are listed separately).

0–9 

 100 Demons
 108
 36 Crazyfists
 50 Lions
 7 Angels 7 Plagues

A 
 Abandon All Ships
 The Acacia Strain
 Across Five Aprils
 Adept
 Advent
 Affiance
 After the Burial
 The Afterimage
 The Agonist
 The Agony Scene
 Alesana
 All Pigs Must Die
 All Out War
 All That Remains
 Alpha Wolf
 Amaranthe
 Amatory
 American Me
 American Standards
 The Amity Affliction
 Annisokay
 Antagonist
 Antagonist A.D.
 Any Given Day
 Architect
 Architects
 Arma Angelus
 The Armed
 Arsonists Get All the Girls
 As Blood Runs Black
 As I Lay Dying
 The Ascendicate
 Asking Alexandria
 Atreyu
 Attack Attack!
 Attila
 August Burns Red
 Avenged Sevenfold
 AWS
 AxeWound

B 
 Bad Omens
 Beartooth
 Becoming the Archetype
 Before Their Eyes
 Beloved
 Beneath the Sky
 Betraying the Martyrs
 Between the Buried and Me
 Black Veil Brides
 Blakfish
 The Bled
 Bleed from Within
 Bleed the Sky
 Bleeding Through
 Blessed by a Broken Heart
 Blessthefall
 Blood Has Been Shed
 Bloodlined Calligraphy
 Botch
 Born of Osiris
 A Breach of Silence
 Breather Resist
 Bring Me the Horizon
 Broken Teeth
 The Browning
 Bullet for My Valentine
 A Bullet for Pretty Boy
 The Bunny the Bear
 Burden of a Day
 Buried in Verona
 Burnt by the Sun
 Burst
 Bury Tomorrow
 Bury Your Dead
 Butcher Babies

C 
 Caliban
 Callejon
 Candiria
 Cane Hill
 Capture
 Carpathian
 Cataract
 Cave In
 Century
 Changer
 The Chariot
 Chimaira
 Chunk! No, Captain Chunk!
 Coalesce
 Code Orange
 Coldrain
 The Color Morale
 Confession
 Confide
 Conquer Divide
 Converge
 Corpus Christi
 Counterparts
 Cover Your Tracks
 The Crimson Armada
 Creation Is Crucifixion
 Crossfaith
 Crown the Empire
 Cry of the Afflicted
 Crystal Lake
 Cult Leader
 Currents

D 
 Damnation A.D.
 Dar Sangre
 Darkest Hour
 Darkness Divided
 Darkness Dynamite
 Dayseeker
 A Day to Remember
 Dead by April
 The Dead Rabbitts
 Deadguy
 Dead to Fall
 Deathgaze
 Demise of Eros
 Demon Hunter
 Deny
 Design the Skyline
 Destroy the Runner
 Devil Sold His Soul
 The Devil Wears Prada
 Diecast
 The Dillinger Escape Plan
 Disembodied
 Doch Chkae
 Drowningman

E 
 Earth Crisis
 Eighteen Visions
 Electric Callboy
 Elitist
 Elysia
 Embrace the End
 Emmure
 The End
 Enter Shikari
 Erra
 Escape the Fate
 The Esoteric
 Eternal Lord
 Everdown
 Evergreen Terrace
 Every Time I Die
 Every Knee Shall Bow
 Everyone Dies in Utah
 The Eyes of a Traitor
 Eyes Set to Kill

F 
 The Fall of Troy
 Falling in Reverse
 Famous Last Words
 Fear, and Loathing in Las Vegas
 Fear Before
 Feed Her to the Sharks
 Figure Four
 Fit for a King
 Focused
 For All Eternity
 For All I Am
 For All Those Sleeping
 For the Fallen Dreams
 For Today
 Forevermore
 From a Second Story Window
 From Autumn to Ashes
 From Her Eyes
 Frontside

G 
 The Ghost Inside
 Gaza
 Get Scared
 Gideon
 Glamour of the Kill
 Glass Cloud
 God Forbid
 Goodbye to Gravity
 Graves of Valor
 The Great Commission
 Greeley Estates
 Gunmetal Grey
 Gwen Stacy

H 
 Haste the Day
 Hatebreed
 He Is Legend
 Heart in Hand
 Heaven Shall Burn
 Heavy Heavy Low Low
 Himsa
 His Statue Falls
 Hoods
 The Hope Conspiracy
 Horse the Band
 House vs. Hurricane
 The Human Abstract

I 
 I Killed the Prom Queen
 I Prevail
 I See Stars
 I Set My Friends on Fire
 I, the Breather
 Ice Nine Kills
 Imminence
 In Dying Arms
 In Fear and Faith
 In Hearts Wake
 In This Moment
 Infected Rain
 Inhale Exhale
 Integrity
 Invent, Animate
 Ion Dissonance
 Issues
 It Dies Today
 It Prevails
 Iwrestledabearonce

J
 Jamie's Elsewhere
 Jesuit
 Jesus Piece
 Jinjer
 Johnny Truant

K 
 Keelhaul
 The Killing Tree
 Killswitch Engage
 King 810
 Knocked Loose
 Kublai Khan

L 
 Lamb of God
 Last Chance to Reason
 Letlive
 Life in Your Way
 A Life Once Lost
 Liferuiner
 Ligeia
 Light the Torch
 Like Moths to Flames
 Living Sacrifice
 Loathe
 Lorna Shore
 Lotus Eater
 Luti-Kriss

M 
 Malevolence
 Make Me Famous
 Make Them Suffer
 Maximum the Hormone
 Memphis May Fire
 Merauder
 Misery Signals
 Miss May I
 More Than a Thousand
 Morning Again
 Most Precious Blood
 Motionless in White
 My Ticket Home
 MyChildren MyBride
 Myka, Relocate
 Mutiny Within

N 
 Narrows
 Nine Shrines
 No Sin Evades His Gaze
 Nora
 Norma Jean
 Northlane
 The Number Twelve Looks Like You

O 
 Oathbreaker
 Obey the Brave
 Oceans Ate Alaska
 Odd Project
 Of Mice & Men
 Oh, Sleeper
 On Broken Wings
 Once Nothing
 One King Down
 One Morning Left
 The Ongoing Concept
 Our Last Night
 Our Mirage
 Overcast
 Overcome
 The Overseer

P 
 Palisades
 Parkway Drive
 Phinehas
 Pierce the Veil
 A Plea for Purging
 Polaris
 The Plot in You
 Point of No Return
 Poison the Well
 Prayer for Cleansing
 Protest the Hero

R 
 Racetraitor
 Raunchy
 Ravenface
 RedHook
 Reflections
 Righteous Vendetta
 Ringworm
 Rise and Fall
 Rise to Remain
 Rolo Tomassi
 Rorschach

S 
 Scarlet
 Scars of Tomorrow
 Secrets
 Senses Fail
 Sea of Treachery
 See You Next Tuesday
 SeeYouSpaceCowboy
 Shadows Fall
 Shaped by Fate
 Sharptooth
 Shai Hulud
 Shattered Sun
 Showbread
 The Showdown
 Sikth
 Silent Civilian
 Silent Planet
 Silent Screams
 SiM
 Sirens and Sailors
 Skip the Foreplay
 Sky Eats Airplane
 Skycamefalling
 A Skylit Drive
 Slapshock
 Sleeping by the Riverside
 Sleeping Giant
 Sleeping with Sirens
 Society's Finest
 Sonic Syndicate
 The Sorrow
 Spiritbox
 Spitfire
 Static Dress
 Starkweather
 Stick to Your Guns
 Stigmata
 Still Remains
 Straight Line Stitch
 Stray from the Path
 Sworn In
 Sylar
 Sylosis
 Sympathy for Nothing

T 
 Tallah
 Tear Out the Heart
 Texas in July
 Textures
 This Day Forward
 This or the Apocalypse
 Thousand Below
 Threat Signal
 Throwdown
 Thrown into Exile
 Thy Will Be Done
 Times of Grace
 To Speak of Wolves
 The Tony Danza Tapdance Extravaganza
 A Tragedy in Progress
 Training for Utopia
 Trenches
 Trivium
 Twelve Gauge Valentine
 Twelve Tribes

U 
 Underneath the Gun
 Underoath
 Unearth
 Upon a Burning Body
 Upon This Dawning

V 
 Vampires Everywhere!
 Vanna
 Varials 
 Vassline
 Veil of Maya
 Vein
 Versus Me
 Vision of Disorder
 Volumes

W 
 Wage War
 Walls of Jericho
 War from a Harlots Mouth
 War of Ages
 We Are Defiance
 We Butter the Bread with Butter
 We Came as Romans
 While She Sleeps
 The White Noise
 Will Haven
 Within the Ruins
 Woe, Is Me
 Wolves at the Gate
 The Word Alive
 Wovenwar

X 
 xDeathstarx
 Xibalba

Y 
 Yashin
 Years Since the Storm
 Your Demise
 Your Memorial

Z 
 Zao

See also 
 List of melodic metalcore bands
 List of mathcore bands
 List of deathcore bands
 List of post-hardcore bands
 List of electronicore bands
 List of djent bands
 List of industrial metal bands
 List of heavy metal bands
 List of hardcore punk bands
 List of crossover thrash bands

References

Metalcore
Lists of metalcore bands